Kornkan Sutthikoses (born 17 October 1988), nicknamed Arm, is a Thai actor. He was first runner-up for the 18th KPN Award Thailand Singing Contest 2009 and won the popular vote. He graduated from Saint Dominic School and Chulalongkorn University. He took part in The mask Singer Season 1 under Bell mask.

Works

Music 
 Wai Jai
 Khor Rong
 Tabakngam
 Kid Tung
 Parn La Nue
 Kem Naliga
 Chan Mai Chai – 2004

Television series

Musical

References

External links 
 Facebook Kornkan Sutthikoses Facebook ของอาร์ม
 Instagram : Armkornkan IG อาร์ม

1988 births
Living people
Kornkan Sutthikoses
Kornkan Sutthikoses
Kornkan Sutthikoses
Kornkan Sutthikoses
Kornkan Sutthikoses